Frederick Francis Lear (April 7, 1894 – October 13, 1955) was a Major League Baseball third baseman.

References

Major League Baseball third basemen
Philadelphia Athletics players
Chicago Cubs players
New York Giants (NL) players
Chicago White Sox scouts
Wheeling Stogies players
Toronto Maple Leafs (International League) players
San Antonio Bears players
Milwaukee Brewers (minor league) players
Baseball players from New York (state)
1894 births
1955 deaths